Gornja Glama is a village in the municipality of Bela Palanka, Serbia. The village had a population of 34 in 2002.

References

Populated places in Pirot District